Yankee Dudler is a 1973 German-Spanish western film directed by Volker Vogeler, written by Ulf Miehe and Volker Vogeler, composed by Luis de Pablo and starred by Arthur Brauss, Francisco Algora and Joaquín Rodríguez.

Cast

See also
 Jaider, der einsame Jäger (1971)

References

External links
 

1973 films
1973 Western (genre) films
West German films
German Western (genre) films
Spanish Western (genre) films
Films directed by Volker Vogeler
Films produced by Elías Querejeta
Films scored by Luis de Pablo
Films shot in Madrid
German sequel films
1970s German films